World of Weird is a British documentary series narrated by Sarah Millican. Vicky Pattison, Joel Dommett, Ayo Akinwolere, Ben Shires, Brent Zillwood and others meet people who undertake what are considered to be unusual activities, and after learning about the activity, then try it for themselves. It is broadcast on Channel 4. The pilot was shown in September 2015 and a six episode series began in September 2016.

Episodes

Pilot

Series 1

References

External links 
World of Weird at Channel 4

2015 British television series debuts
2016 British television series endings
2010s British documentary television series
Channel 4 documentary series
English-language television shows